The 2019 Team Speedway Junior European Championship was the 12th Team Speedway Junior European Championship season. It was organised by the Fédération Internationale de Motocyclisme and was the 8th as an under 21 years of age event.

The final took place on 28 September 2019 in Lamothe-Landerron, France. The defending champions Denmark and eight times winners Poland both finished on 50 points each. As a result a run-off was required and Poland's Jakub Miśkowiak beat Jonas Seifert-Salk to reclaim the title for Poland.

Results

Final
  Lamothe-Landerron
 28 September 2019

Gold Medal Run-Off: Miskowiak beat Seifert.

See also 
 2019 Team Speedway Junior World Championship
 2019 Individual Speedway Junior European Championship

References 

2019
European Team Junior